No. 7 Airfield Construction Squadron (7ACS) was a Royal Australian Air Force (RAAF) construction squadron. The unit was first formed in October 1943 as No. 7 Mobile Works Squadron and served in the New Guinea Campaign and Bougainville Campaign during World War II. 7ACS was disbanded in June 1947.

References
Notes

Bibliography
 
 
 
 

7
7
7
Airfield
Military units and formations of the Royal Australian Air Force in World War II